Don Bosco Cristo Rey High School is a private, Roman Catholic high school and work study program in Takoma Park, Maryland in the D. C. area.  It is cosponsored by the Roman Catholic Archdiocese of Washington and the Salesians of Don Bosco. The school is named for St. John Bosco, founder of the Salesian order, and is part of a national Cristo Rey network of 28 schools. It offers a challenging college-preparatory academic program and fully integrated work study program, in which students gain professional work experience at nearly 100 leading Washington-area businesses and earn money to pay for a significant portion of their tuition. The school finished renovation in 2007, graduated its first class in 2011, and finished adding a new science wing in 2014.

Background
Don Bosco Cristo Rey High School opened for classes on August 28, 2007, with 127 students enrolled. The school graduated its first class in 2011.  It is part of the Cristo Rey Network of high schools, the original being Cristo Rey Jesuit High School in Chicago. The school is run by the Salesians of Don Bosco, and they run another Cristo Rey school in Tampa, Cristo Rey Tampa Salesian High School.

All students are from families with limited financial means, and each student works one day a week (Tuesday–Friday) plus one Monday per month. The jobs that the students are employed in help pay for the bulk of the tuition.

In 2014, the school completed construction of a new wing that will primarily serve science classes. Cardinal Donald Wuerl blessed the new wing in a ceremony on September 4, 2014.

The current president is Mark Shriver. The current principal is Elias Blanco.  Ana Chapa is the vice president of organizational growth. Ben Runyon is the vice president of operations.

References

Further reading
 Kearney, G. R. More Than a Dream: The Cristo Rey Story: How One School's Vision Is Changing the World. Chicago, Ill: Loyola Press, 2008.

External links
 
 Work Study at Bosco
 Cristo Rey Network
 Fr. John P. Foley honored with Presidential Citizen's Medal
60 minutes
Cristo Rey Featured in WashPost column by George Will
 Boston Globe - With sense of purpose, students cut class for a day 
 Bill & Melinda Gates Foundation - Success of Innovative Urban Catholic School Sparks Major Investment

2007 establishments in Maryland
Buildings and structures in Takoma Park, Maryland
Catholic secondary schools in Maryland
Cristo Rey Network
Educational institutions established in 2007
Poverty-related organizations
Salesian secondary schools
Private high schools in Montgomery County, Maryland